Dame Prudence Margaret Leith,  (born 18 February 1940) is a South African restaurateur, chef, caterer, television presenter/broadcaster, journalist, cookery writer and novelist. 

She is Chancellor of Queen Margaret University, Edinburgh. She was a judge on BBC Two's Great British Menu for eleven years, before joining The Great British Bake Off in March 2017, replacing Mary Berry, when the television programme moved to Channel 4.

Early life

Leith was born in Cape Town, South Africa. Her father, Sam Leith, worked for African Explosives, a subsidiary of ICI, producing dynamite for use in mines, and ultimately served as a director. Her mother, Margaret "Peggy" Inglis, was an actress. 

From the age of 5 until she was 17, Leith attended St Mary's School, Waverley, an English independent private boarding school for girls in Johannesburg run by Anglican nuns. She left with a first class matriculation and studied at the University of Cape Town, where she failed to follow for any length of time courses in drama, fine art, architecture or French.  She persuaded her parents to allow her to attend the Sorbonne (formally, the University of Paris), ostensibly to learn French better while studying the Cours de Civilisation Française.   While in Paris, she finally realised she wanted a career in the food industry.

Career

In 1960, Leith moved to London to attend the Cordon Bleu Cookery School and then began a business supplying high-quality business lunches. This grew to become Leith's Good Food, a party and event caterer. In 1969, she opened Leith's, her Michelin-starred restaurant in Notting Hill, eventually selling it in 1995. In 1975, she founded Leith's School of Food and Wine, which trains professional chefs and amateur cooks. The group reached a turnover of £15 million in 1993, which she then sold. In 1995, she helped found the Prue Leith College (since renamed Prue Leith Chef's Academy) in South Africa.  

The first woman appointed to the British Railways Board in 1977, she set about improving its much-criticised catering. The catering division, Travellers Fare, was detached from the hotels business in 1982 with outlets created, including Casey Jones and Upper Crust.

Concurrently with running her business, Leith became a food columnist for, successively, the Daily Mail, Sunday Express, The Guardian and the Daily Mirror. Aside from writing 12 cookery books, including Leith's Cookery Bible, she has written seven novels: Leaving Patrick, Sisters, A Lovesome Thing, Choral Society, A Serving of Scandal, The Food of Love: Laura's Story and The Prodigal Daughter. These last two form part of the Food of Love trilogy. Her memoir, Relish, was published in 2013.

Her first television appearance was in the 1970s as a presenter of two 13-episode magazine series aimed at women at home, made by Tyne Tees Television. She was a last-minute replacement for Jack de Manio, and with no experience and a director who liked everything scripted, including interviews, she disliked the experience. Later, in the 1980s, she was the subject of two television programmes about her life and career: the first episode of Channel 4's Take Six Cooks and the BBC's The Best of British, a series about young entrepreneurs. In 1999, she was one of the Commissioners on Channel 4's Poverty Commission. She returned to television to be a judge on The Great British Menu for 11 years until 2016 and a judge for My Kitchen Rules, which she left to replace Mary Berry in The Great British Bake Off.

She has been involved in food in education. When chair of the Royal Society of Arts she founded and chaired the charity Focus on Food (now part of the Soil Association) which promotes cooking in the curriculum. She also started, with the charity Training for Life, the Hoxton Apprentice; a not-for-profit restaurant which for ten years trained the most disadvantaged long-term unemployed young people. Until 2015, she was a member of the Food Strand of the grant-giving foundation, Esmée Fairbairne. From 2007 to 2010, she was the Chair of the School Food Trust, the government quango largely responsible for the improvement in school food after Jamie Oliver’s television exposé of the poor state of school dinners. The Trust (now the Children's Food Trust) also set up and runs Let's Get Cooking, an organisation of over 5,000 cooking clubs in state schools, of which she is a patron. She is vice-president of The Sustainable Restaurant Association; a trustee of Baby Taste Journey (an education charity concerned with healthy food for infants); Patron of The Institute for Food, Brain and Behaviour, Sustain's Campaign for Better Hospital Food, and the Prue Leith Chef's Academy in her native South Africa.  
 
She has also been active in general education, chairing Ashridge Management College (2002–07); 3E's Enterprises (an education company turning round failing schools and managing academies (1998–2006) and Chairman of Governors at the secondary school Kings College in Guildford (2000–07).  

She has also been involved in many  diverse organisations: she chaired the Restaurateurs Association (1990–94); she was a member of the Investors in People working group; she chaired the Royal Society of Arts (1995–97); and Forum for the Future (2000–03). She was a director of the housing association, Places for People (1999–2003) and a member of the Consumer Debt Working Group that contributed to the Conservative Party's 2006 policy document Breakdown Britain (2004–05). She has also been one of the voices in favour of Brexit, defending her choice, although lately voicing concern over lowering of food standards.

While at the RSA, she led the successful campaign to use the empty plinth, now known as the Fourth Plinth, in Trafalgar Square to house changing sculptures or installations by the best contemporary artists.  

Leith has been a non-executive director of British Rail; British Transport Hotels; Safeway; Argyll plc, the Leeds Permanent Building Society; Whitbread plc; Woolworths plc; the Halifax; Triven VCT; Omega International plc; and Belmond Hotels Ltd (formerly Orient Express Hotels) and is a director and investor in several start-up companies.  

In July 2017, she was installed as the Chancellor of Queen Margaret University, Edinburgh.

Personal life

Leith was married to property developer and author Rayne Kruger, with whom she had previously had a 13-year affair while he was married to his first wife, from 1974 until his death aged 80 in December 2002. The couple had two children, a son and a daughter. Their daughter, Li-Da Kruger (a Cambodian adoptee), is a filmmaker. Their son, Danny Kruger, was a speechwriter and adviser to David Cameron, and became the MP for the safe Conservative constituency of Devizes in December 2019.

Similarly to Prue who said: "‘I ended up voting for Brexit but I dithered and dithered for ages because there were really good arguments on both sides", Danny Kruger has voiced his support for the exit from the EU.

In October 2016, Leith married John Playfair, a retired clothes designer; the couple live apart in separate homes.

Her brother, ex-restaurateur James Leith, is married to the biographer Penny Junor.

Leith faced criticism from the eating disorder awareness charity Beat for her The Great British Bakeoff catchphrase “Worth the calories,” which Beat believes is triggering to those who suffer from eating disorders.

In May 2020, she expressed support of the breach of virus lockdown by Dominic Cummings and Mary Wakefield, whom her son described as "old friends."

In December 2021, she was the guest on BBC Radio 4's Desert Island Discs. She is an atheist.

Honours

Leith's honours include the  Business Woman of the Year in 1990 and thirteen honorary degrees or fellowships from UK universities.

She was appointed Officer of the Order of the British Empire (OBE) in 1989, Commander of the Order of the British Empire (CBE) in the 2010 Birthday Honours and Dame Commander of the Order of the British Empire (DBE) in the 2021 Birthday Honours for services to food, broadcasting and charity.

References

External links

Prue Leith Chefs Academy and Catering, South Africa
Leiths School of Food and Wine
 Podcast interview with Prue Leith On the occasion of her being awarded the degree of Honorary Doctor of Letters by the University of Warwick in January 2013

1940 births
Living people
South African chefs
South African educators
South African emigrants to the United Kingdom
British food writers
British television presenters
Dames Commander of the Order of the British Empire
Alumni of St Mary's School, Waverley
Restaurant founders
Women chefs
British women company founders
South African women company founders
British company founders
British women television presenters
South African women television presenters
South African cookbook writers
Kruger family
Deputy Lieutenants of Greater London